Ian Puleston-Davies (born 6 September 1958) is a Welsh actor and writer. He is best known for his role as builder Owen Armstrong in the ITV soap opera Coronation Street from 2010 to 2015. 
In November 2014, ITV announced that Puleston-Davies had quit his role as Owen Armstrong in Coronation Street, and his character departed from the show on 15 April 2015.

Early life and career
Born in Flint, north Wales, Puleston-Davies starred in the ITV drama Vincent alongside Ray Winstone and in Ghostboat (also for ITV) alongside David Jason. He also played the lead roles in Conviction and the BBC Three series Funland.

He has starred in long-running dramas such as EastEnders, Holby City, The Bill, Hollyoaks and Brookside. He has also made special appearances in Hustle, Life on Mars, Dalziel and Pascoe, Silent Witness, I'm Alan Partridge, and Cape Wrath. In 2007, he starred in the Channel 4 docudrama, Richard Is My Boyfriend.

In 2009, Puleston-Davies was chosen to play the voiceover part of King Thistle in the children's animated television series Ben and Holly's Little Kingdom.

From September to October 2010, he played the role of Charlie Fisher in the sixth series of the BBC One drama, Waterloo Road.

In 2010, Puleston-Davies joined Coronation Street as cast regular, Owen Armstrong. He quit the show in November 2014, and his on-screen character departed in April 2015.

In 2005, he co-wrote the drama Dirty Filthy Love, based upon his own experiences dealing with obsessive–compulsive disorder. Dirty Filthy Love won a Royal Television Society Award for Best Single Drama and was nominated for the BAFTA Award for "Best Single Drama".

In January, Puleston-Davies starred in The Teacher alongside Sheridan Smith.

Personal life
Puleston-Davies lives in Cheshire with his partner, Sue, and their two children, Maggie and Charlie. He is the cousin of former World Champion kickboxer, Russ Williams.

Puleston-Davies is the patron of Red Dot Drama, an acting workshop group that was formed by Helena Little, a friend of his from the Guildhall School of Music and Drama. He is also patron of the CALM Centre, a charity that provides counseling and therapeutic services to the community of Harlow and its environs. Puleston-Davies has spoken at length about his personal struggles with obsessive–compulsive disorder, making a documentary for BBC Wales in 2017. He also supports the work of the national charity OCD-UK, where he is an active patron, frequently presenting at their annual conferences.

Selected credits

Screen

Stage
The Mill on the Floss (1994) (Shared Experience)
Charley's Aunt (1994) (The Royal Exchange Theatre)
She Stoops to Conquer (1995) (Bristol Old Vic)
A Passionate Woman (1995) (The Comedy Theatre)
Lebenstraum (1998) (The King's Head)
Everyone Loves a Winner (2009) (The Royal Exchange Theatre)

References

External links

1958 births
British male screenwriters
Living people
People from Flint, Flintshire
People with obsessive–compulsive disorder
Welsh male soap opera actors
Welsh male television actors
Welsh male stage actors
Welsh male voice actors